Black River Technical College (BRTC) is a public community college in Pocahontas, Arkansas.  It is named for the Black River which runs through the city. BRTC serves approximately 3,000 students annually through its degree programs, technical courses, and community educational offerings.

History 
BRTC was established in 1972 as Black River Vocational Technical School on land donated by the City of Pocahontas, Arkansas.  BRTC's original purpose was to provide vocational education for the Northeast Arkansas region.  The college adopted its current name in 1991 and became an independent institution of higher education in 1993 at which time it offered associates degrees and college courses toward core requirements for four-year schools.

Governance 
BRTC is governed by a seven-member board of trustees appointed by the governor. Each trustee serves a seven-year term which ends on June 30 of the final year.

Campus 

BRTC also has one offsite location in Paragould about 40 minutes away from Pocahontas that offers technical and general education credit and workforce training. It is also the location for the Greene County Industrial Training Center.

Academics 
BRTC offers the Associate of Arts degree, which can be credited toward the first two years of a four-year degree program.  The degree consists of a total of 60/61 hours in required courses and electives (which must be college transfer classes).  BRTC also offers the Associate of Science degree and the Associate of Applied Science degree.  Additionally, the college offers Technical Certificates, Certificates of Proficiency and adult education courses.
 
BRTC offers many courses and some full programs through various forms of distance education; the Associate of Applied Science in Registered Nursing courses in nursing theory are done completely by interactive video as part of the Arkansas Rural Nursing Education Consortium (ARNEC), of which BRTC's program is a member.

The BRTC Fire Science program is offered in conjunction with the Arkansas Fire Academy.

Accreditation 
BRTC is accredited by the Higher Learning Commission of the North Central Association of Colleges and Schools, and its programs have been approved by the Arkansas Department of Higher Education and the Arkansas State Board of Vocational Education.

The following programs have received additional accreditation or approval as shown below:

References

External links
Official website

Educational institutions established in 1972
Buildings and structures in Randolph County, Arkansas
Education in Randolph County, Arkansas
Community colleges in Arkansas
1972 establishments in Arkansas